The 2nd constituency of the Rhône (French: Deuxième circonscription du Rhône) is a French legislative constituency in the Rhône département. Like the other 576 French constituencies, it elects one MP using a two round electoral system.

Description

The 2nd constituency of the Rhône includes parts of Lyon, including those immediately to the north of the city centre. It is an urban seat in France's second largest city. Since 2015 this constituency has been part of the Lyon Metropolis and therefore outside of the Rhône for administrative purposes.

Politically the seat swung towards the left in the first decade of the 21st Century, with the Socialist Party winning the seat for the first time in its current form, after many years of centre right control. The constituency opted for En Marche! in 2017 elections reflecting the large surge of support for Emmanuel Macron across the Rhône.  In 2020, the deputy, Hubert Julien-Laferrière was one of the 17 initial members of the Ecology Democracy Solidarity group which broke away from En Marche!.

Assembly Members

Election results

2022

 
 
 
 
|-
| colspan="8" bgcolor="#E9E9E9"|
|-
 
 

 
 
 
 
 * Julien-Laferriere ran for LREM at the previous election. Swings are calculated by alliances and the parties within them.

** Prieto stood as a dissident member of PS, without the support of the party or the NUPES alliance.

2017

 
 
 
 
 
 
 
|-
| colspan="8" bgcolor="#E9E9E9"|
|-

2012

 
 
 
 
 
 
 
|-
| colspan="8" bgcolor="#E9E9E9"|
|-

2007

 
 
 
 
 
 
 
|-
| colspan="8" bgcolor="#E9E9E9"|
|-

2002

 
 
 
 
 
 
|-
| colspan="8" bgcolor="#E9E9E9"|
|-

1997

 
 
 
 
 
 
 
|-
| colspan="8" bgcolor="#E9E9E9"|
|-
 
 

 
 
 
 
 

* RPR dissident

References

2